Vexillum acupictum, common name : the pinpricked mitre, is a species of small sea snail, marine gastropod mollusk in the family Costellariidae, the ribbed miters.

Description
The shell size varies between 13 mm and 46 mm

The white shell is tinged with yellowish or pink, profusely spotted and maculated with chestnut or chocolate color.

Distribution
This species occurs in the Red Sea, in the Indian Ocean off Madagascar, the Mascarene Basin and Mauritius, and in the Western Pacific Ocean and Japan; also off New Caledonia and Australia (Queensland).

References

 Smith, E.A. 1903. Marine Mollusca. (pp. 589-630, pls. XXXV-XXXVI) in Gardiner, J.S. (ed.). The Fauna and Geography of the Maldive and Laccadive Archipelagoes, being the account of work carried on and of the collections made by an expedition during the years 1899 and 1900. Cambridge : University Press Vol. II(Part II) pp. 589–698, pls. XXXV-XLVIII). 
 Dautzenberg, P. & Bouge, L.J. 1923. Mitridés de la Nouvelle-Calédonie et de ses dépendances. Journal de Conchyliologie 67(2): 179-259
 Dautzenberg, Ph. (1929). Mollusques testaces marins de Madagascar. Faune des Colonies Francaises, Tome III
 Cernohorsky, W.O. 1970. Systematics of the families Mitridae & Volutomitridae (Mollusca: Gastropoda). Bulletin of the Auckland Institute and Museum. Auckland, New Zealand 8: 1-190 
 Hinton, A. 1972. Shells of New Guinea and the central Indo-Pacific. Milton : Jacaranda Press xviii 94 pp. 
 Springsteen, F.J. & Leobrera, F.M. 1986. Shells of the Philippines. Manila : Carfel Seashell Museum 377 pp., 100 pls. 
 Drivas, J. & M. Jay (1988). Coquillages de La Réunion et de l'île Maurice
 Wilson, B. 1994. Australian marine shells. Prosobranch gastropods. Kallaroo, WA : Odyssey Publishing Vol. 2 370 pp. 
 Arnaud, J.P., Berthault, C., Jeanpierre, R., Martin, J.C. & Martin, P. 2002. Costellariidae et Mitridae de Nouvelle Calédonie. Xenophora. Association française de conchyliologie. Supplément 100: 52 pp.
 Turner H. 2001. Katalog der Familie Costellariidae Macdonald, 1860. Conchbooks. 1-100 page(s): 14
 Thach, N.N. 2002. The miters of Vietnam. Of Sea and Shore 25(1): 40-51 
 Steyn, D. G.; Lussi, M. (2005). Offshore Shells of Southern Africa: A pictorial guide to more than 750 Gastropods. Published by the authors. pp. i–vi, 1–289.

External links
 
 Reeve, L. A. (1844-1845). Monograph of the genus Mitra. In: Conchologia Iconica, or, illustrations of the shells of molluscous animals, vol. 2, pl. 1-39 and unpaginated text. L. Reeve & Co., London.
 Dohrn, H. (1860). Description of new species of Mitra from the collection of Hugh Cuming, Esq. Proceedings of the Zoological Society of London. 28: 366-368
  Cernohorsky, Walter Oliver. The Mitridae of Fiji; The veliger vol. 8 (1965)
  Liénard, Élizé. Catalogue de la faune malacologique de l'île Maurice et de ses dépendances comprenant les îles Seychelles, le groupe de Chagos composé de Diego-Garcia, Six-îles, Pèros-Banhos, Salomon, etc., l'île Rodrigues, l'île de Cargados ou Saint-Brandon. J. Tremblay, 1877.

acupictum
Gastropods described in 1845